József Kovács (born 8 April 1949 in Balatonlelle) was a Hungarian football midfielder who played for Videoton SC and Újpesti Dózsa.

He won a silver medal in football at the 1972 Summer Olympics, and also participated in UEFA Euro 1972 for the Hungary national football team.

Honours
Újpesti Dózsa
 Magyar Kupa: 1981–82, 1982–83

Hungary
 Summer Olympics runner-up: 1972

References

Sources
 Ki kicsoda a magyar sportéletben?, II. kötet (I–R). Szekszárd, Babits Kiadó, 1995, 173. o.,  
 Botos István: A Videoton labdarúgó krónikája (Székesfehérvár, 1991)  
 Rejtő László–Lukács László–Szepesi György: Felejthetetlen 90 percek (Sportkiadó, 1977)  

1949 births
Living people
People from Balatonlelle
Association football midfielders
Hungarian footballers
Fehérvár FC players
Újpest FC players
Hungary international footballers
UEFA Euro 1972 players
Olympic footballers of Hungary
Footballers at the 1972 Summer Olympics
Medalists at the 1972 Summer Olympics
Olympic silver medalists for Hungary
Olympic medalists in football
Sportspeople from Somogy County